Ziyah (also Romanized as Zīyah) is a village in Emamzadeh Seyyed Mahmud Rural District, Sardasht District, Dezful County, Khuzestan Province, Iran. At the 2006 census, its population was 28, in 5 families.

References 

Populated places in Dezful County